The 1975 Oakland Raiders season was the team's 16th season, and 6th in the National Football League.

The 1975 season would be George Blanda's final season in the NFL. Blanda retired with two significant records: the most seasons in American professional football (26), and most games played (340). The Raiders would finish the season with an 11–3 record and won the AFC West for the 4th straight year. They also made the playoffs for the 4th straight season. In the playoffs, the Raiders stunned the Cincinnati Bengals 31–28 in the Divisional Round. In the AFC Championship game, their third straight, they lost to the Steelers for the second straight season 16–10. 

Opposing quarterbacks had a passer rating of 37.2 against Oakland in 1975, the second-lowest total of the Super Bowl era. The Raiders defeated the Dolphins to win their season opener for the first time since 1969.

Offseason

NFL Draft

Roster

Regular season

Schedule

Season summary

Week 10

Standings

Playoffs
The Raiders defeated the Cincinnati Bengals 31–28 in the divisional round in Oakland.  The following Sunday, they fell to the Pittsburgh Steelers 16–10 in the AFC Championship Game.

Oakland Raiders 31, Cincinnati Bengals 28

Pittsburgh Steelers 16, Oakland Raiders 10

Awards and honors
George Blanda, most seasons in American professional football (26)
George Blanda, most games played, (340)

References

Raiders on Pro Football Reference
Raiders on Database Football

Oakland
Oakland Raiders seasons
AFC West championship seasons
Oakland